The 2021–22 George Mason Patriots Men's basketball team represented George Mason University during the 2021–22 NCAA Division I men's basketball season. The season was the 56th for the program, the first under head coach Kim English, and the ninth as members of the Atlantic 10 Conference. The Patriots played their home games at EagleBank Arena in Fairfax, Virginia.

Previous season
In a season limited due to the ongoing COVID-19 pandemic, the Patriots finished the 2020–21 season 13–9, 8–6 in A-10 play to finish in sixth place. They defeated George Washington in the second round of the A-10 tournament before losing to Davidson in the quarterfinals.

On March 16, 2021, the school fired head coach Dave Paulsen. A week later, the school named Tennessee assistant Kim English the team's new head coach.

Offseason

Departures

Arrivals

Source

Honors and awards
All Atlantic 10 First Team
 Josh Oduro 

Atlantic 10 Player of the Week
 Josh Oduro - Nov. 15

Roster

Player statistics

Schedule and results

|-
!colspan=12 style=| Non-conference regular season

|-
!colspan=12 style=| A-10 regular season

|-
!colspan=12 style=| A-10 tournament

|-

Source

References

George Mason
George Mason Patriots men's basketball seasons
George Mason men's basketball
George Mason men's basketball